This is a list of notable goat dishes, which use goat meat as a primary ingredient. Goat meat is the meat of the domestic goat (Capra aegagrus hircus). It is often called chevon or mutton when the meat comes from adults, and cabrito, capretto, or kid when from young animals. Worldwide, goat meat is less widely consumed than pork, beef, and poultry.

Goat dishes

Curry dishes 
 
 
  gosht
 
 
 
 Mutton balti

Meat pies 

 Mutton pasty

Rice dishes 
Kabsa can be made with goat meat and wild vegetables such as asparagus. This may be related to the origin of paella.

Salads 

 Vietnamese citrus cured goat salad

Soups and stews 

 
 Chui jhal – A stew from Khulna, Bangladesh

Miscellaneous 

 Apohtin
 Argentine mutton berbeque
 Bhutan – A spicy  dish prepared with goat tripe. A speciality in Nepal.
 Bocksbraten, a specialty in the surroundings of Bamberg in Germany, which is usually offered for the church consecration (Kirchweih).
 Boodog, a dish from Mongolia where pre-heated stones are put into a goat's carcass
 Cabrito – roast goat kid
 
 
 
 
 
 
 
 
 
 .
 .
 .
 
 
   
 
 Heugyeomso-tang – a Korean black goat stew
 Spanish goat meat hotpot 
 Hyderabadi biryani
 Mutton Karahi 
 Isi ewu – a traditional Igbo dish that is made with a goat's head.
 Italian capretto
  
 
 
  
 
 
  
 
 
 
 
 
 
  Tambda Rassa
  
 
 
  
 
 Bhuteko Masu (Nepalese Pan fried mutton) 
 Mutton paya 
 Roganjosh 
 Sate kambing – made by grilling goat meat that has been mixed with seasoning
 Sate klatak
 Seco (food)
 Shami kebab with goat 
 Mutton Vathal (South Indian cuisine) 
 
 
 
 
 Indian goat Tandoori 
 Raagi Balls – Karnataka, India Geographical Indicator 
 Thukpa
 Tongseng
 Tsamarella
 Goat Vindaloo
 Australian goat Meat pie (Australia and New Zealand)
 Galaoti Kabab – an Indian kebab made from goat fat and meat of goat kid.

See also

 Goat cheese
 List of goat milk cheeses
 Goat milk
 Lists of prepared foods

References

External links

 
Goat dishes